Certains l'aiment froide, is a French comedy film from 1960, directed by Jean Bastia, written by Guy Lionel, starring Louis de Funès. The film is known under the title: "Les râleurs font leur beurre" (alternative French title).

Cast 
 Louis de Funès : Ange Galopin, the creditor who wants to recover silver
 Pierre Dudan : Pierre Valmorin, Swiss compositor
 Robert Manuel : Luigi Valmorin
 Francis Blanche : William, Foster Valmorin, American
 Noël Roquevert : Maître Albert Leboiteux, notary
 Jean Richard : Jérôme Valmorin, the explorer
 Mathilde Casadesus : Mathilde Valmorin, cultivator
 Mireille Perrey : mum of Pierre
 Françoise Béguin : Ariel
 Guy Nelson : Tony, the singer
 Habib Benglia : Hannibal Valmorin, African
 Nicky Valor : Ingrid Valmorin, the Danish
 Jean-Paul Rouland : the doctor Schuster
 Léonce Corne : Maître Meyer, the associate of mister Leboiteux
 Harry Max : the director of the asylum Saint-Vincent
 Max Elloy : Simpson, le majordome particulier de Pierre
 Mario David : Le masseur
 Albert Daumergue : doctor of the prison
 Marie-Pierre Gauthey "Casey" : the nurse
 Pierre Duncan : a security guard of the prison

References

External links 
 
 Certains l'aiment froide (1959) at the Films de France

1960 films
French comedy films
1960s French-language films
French black-and-white films
Films directed by Jean Bastia
1960s French films